Ingenieurs zonder Grenzen (Dutch for Engineers Without Borders) is a name used by two Belgian organizations, both of which are provisional members  of the Engineers Without Borders International network.

See also
Engineers Without Borders (Belgium)

External links 
 Ingenieurs zonder Grenzen (in Dutch) the organization started by the Royal Flemish Engineer Association (K VIV).

Belgium
Development charities based in Belgium